Regina auf den Stufen is a German television series, based on a 1957 novel by Utta Danella.

See also
List of German television series

External links
 

1990s German television miniseries
Television series set in the 1950s
1992 German television series debuts
1992 German television series endings
Television shows based on German novels
German-language television shows
ZDF original programming